Marty Martin may refer to:

 Marty Martin (Wyoming politician) (born 1951), former Wyoming politician
 Earl F. Martin (born 1961), known as Marty, American lawyer, academic and president of Drake University
 Marty Martin (special effects artist) (1897–1964), of RKO Pictures